The 2014 MLS SuperDraft was the fifteenth SuperDraft presented by Major League Soccer. The first two rounds of the four round draft took place on January 16, 2014, in Philadelphia, Pennsylvania at the Philadelphia Convention Center. Rounds three and four took place on January 21, 2014, via conference call.

Changes from 2013 
 The SuperDraft was expanded from two rounds to four rounds.
 The Supplemental Draft, typically held one week after the SuperDraft, was eliminated.

Selection order 
The MLS SuperDraft selection order has been constant throughout league history:

 The nine clubs which do not qualify for the playoffs receive picks #1 through #9 (in reverse order of season points);
 The two clubs eliminated in the Knockout round of playoffs receive picks #10 and #11 (in reverse order of season points);
 The four clubs eliminated in the Conference Semifinals receive picks #12 through #15 (in reverse order of season points);
 The two clubs eliminated in the Conference Finals receive picks #16 and #17 (in reverse order of season points);
 The club which loses 2013 MLS Cup receives pick #18;
 The club which wins 2013 MLS Cup receives pick #19.

This selection order pertains to all rounds of the MLS SuperDraft.

Round 1 
Any player marked with a * is part of the Generation Adidas program.

Round 1 trades

Round 2

Round 2 trades

Round 3

Round 3 trades

Round 4

Round 4 trades

Unresolved 2014 SuperDraft Trades

 Conditional, Houston Dynamo → Toronto FC. December 28, 2011: Toronto FC acquired a conditional selection in the 2014 SuperDraft from Houston Dynamo in exchange for midfielder Nathan Sturgis.
 Round 6 (Supplemental Draft Round 4), FC Dallas → Columbus Crew. June 14, 2013: Columbus Crew acquired a fourth-round selection in the 2014 Supplemental Draft from FC Dallas in exchange for use of an international roster spot for 2013.

Notable undrafted players

Homegrown players

References 

Major League Soccer drafts
SuperDraft
MLS SuperDraft
MLS SuperDraft
Soccer in Pennsylvania
Sports in Philadelphia
Events in Philadelphia
MLS SuperDraft